The Japanese Heavyweight Championship was a professional wrestling championship defended in the Japan Pro Wrestling Alliance. The championship belt was later used by WAR for their J-1 Heavyweight Championship, held by Genichiro Tenryu.

Title history

See also 

 Professional wrestling in Japan
 List of professional wrestling promotions in Japan

References

External links 
 Japanese Heavyweight Title at wrestling-titles.com

Heavyweight wrestling championships
National professional wrestling championships